Sofía (born Princess Sophia of Greece and Denmark, ; born 2 November 1938) is a member of the Spanish royal family who was Queen of Spain from 1975 to 2014 as the wife of King Juan Carlos I. She is the first child of King Paul of Greece and Frederica of Hanover. As her family was forced into exile during the Second World War, she spent part of her childhood in Egypt, returning to Greece in 1946. She completed her secondary education in a boarding school in Germany before returning to Greece where she specialised in childcare, music and archaeology.

Sofía became queen upon her husband's accession in 1975. On 18 June 2014, Juan Carlos abdicated in favour of their son Felipe VI.

Early life
Princess Sophia of Greece and Denmark was born on 2 November 1938, at Tatoi Palace in Acharnes, Athens, Greece, the eldest child of King Paul and his wife, Queen Frederica. Sofía is a member of the Greek branch of the Schleswig-Holstein-Sonderburg-Glücksburg dynasty. Her brother was the deposed King Constantine II and her sister is Princess Irene.

Princess Sophia spent some of her childhood in Egypt where she took her early education in El Nasr Girls' College (EGC) in Alexandria. She lived in South Africa during her family's exile from Greece during World War II, where her sister Irene was born. They returned to Greece in 1946. She finished her education at the prestigious Schloss Salem boarding school in Southern Germany, and then studied childcare, music and archeology in Athens.  She also studied at Fitzwilliam College, Cambridge, a constituent college of the University of Cambridge. She was a reserve member, alongside her brother Constantine, of Greece's gold medal-winning sailing team in the 1960 Summer Olympics.

Marriage and family

Sofía met her paternal third cousin, the then Infante Juan Carlos of Spain on a cruise in the Greek Islands in 1954; they met again at the wedding of the Duke of Kent, her paternal second cousin, at York Minster in June 1961. Sofía and Juan Carlos married on 14 May 1962, at the Catholic Cathedral of Saint Dionysius in Athens. Her bride's gown was made by Jean Dessès.

Sofía converted from Greek Orthodoxy to Catholicism to become more palatable to Catholic Spain, and thus relinquished her rights to the Greek throne. Along with this, the usual Latinisation of her Greek name  was changed from Sophia to the Spanish variant, Sofía.

Sofía was in Greece on a private visit to her brother, King Constantine II, when the 1967 Greek military coup took place. Except for a brief stay for the funeral of her mother in 1981, Queen Sofía would not visit the Hellenic Republic until 1998.

In 1969, Infante Juan Carlos, who was never Prince of Asturias (the traditional title of the Spanish heir apparent), was given the official title of "Prince of Spain" by the Francoist dictatorship. Juan Carlos acceded to the throne in 1975, upon the death of Francisco Franco. Juan Carlos, after his accession to the Spanish throne, returned with his family to the Zarzuela Palace.

The couple has three children: Elena (born 20 December 1963); Cristina (born 13 June 1965); and Felipe (born 30 January 1968).

Activities

 
Besides accompanying her husband on official visits and occasions, Sofía also has solo engagements. She is executive president of the Queen Sofía Foundation, which in 1993, sent funds for relief in Bosnia and Herzegovina, and is honorary president of the Royal Board on Education and Care of Handicapped Persons of Spain, as well as the Spanish Foundation for Aid for Drug Addicts. Additionally, she has served as the patroness of the Queen Sofía Spanish Institute since 2003.

Sofía takes special interest in programs against drug addiction, travelling to conferences in both Spain and abroad. The Museo Nacional Centro de Arte Reina Sofía is named after her, as is Reina Sofía Airport in Tenerife.

Sofía is an Honorary Member of the San Fernando Royal Academy of Fine Arts and of the Spanish Royal Academy of History. She has received honorary doctorates from the Universities of Rosario (Bogotá), Valladolid, Cambridge, Oxford, Georgetown, Evora, St. Mary's University (Texas), and New York.

A keen supporter of sport, Sofía also attended the final match of the 2010 Wimbledon Championships – Men's Singles where she watched Spanish tennis champion Rafael Nadal win for a second time, as well as the 2010 FIFA World Cup where the Spanish team was crowned as world champion.

Sofía has been honorary president of the Spanish Unicef Committee since 1971. She has been working closely with Dr. Muhammad Yunus on his Grameen Bank (or "Village Bank"), which offers microcredits to women across the world. Queen Sofía has travelled to Bangladesh, Chile, Colombia, El Salvador and Mexico to support the activities of the organization led by Yunus. Queen Sofía has also been a strong supporter of Somaly Mam's efforts and of the NGO she founded— (AFESIP)—in combatting child prostitution and slavery in Cambodia. In 1998, Mam was awarded the prestigious Prince of Asturias Award for International Cooperation in her presence.

In July 2012, Sofía visited the Philippines for a fourth time. She inspected several development projects around the former Spanish colony that her country's government is funding via the Agencia Española de Cooperacion Internacional para el Desarollo (AECID). She visited the National Library, National Museum and the Pontifical and Royal University of Santo Tomas, The Catholic University of the Philippines, which had the oldest extant university charter in Asia and housed the world's largest collection of suyat scripts. She also met with Spanish nationals residing in the Philippines, and attended a reception at the Spanish Embassy. She also attended a state dinner in her honour at Malacañan Palace hosted by President Benigno Aquino III, and thanked the president for promoting the Spanish language in the Philippine educational system.

Later activity 
Following the abdication of her husband as King in 2014, Sofía focused on her sponsoring activities, spending her time between La Zarzuela and, in the summer months, the Marivent Palace in Palma de Mallorca.

In April 2018, the video of a tense interaction between Sofía and her daughter-in-law Queen Letizia following the Easter Mass at Palma Cathedral made headlines. The rumours of a conflict between the two dates back to 2008. Letizia was reportedly "dismayed" by the rumours and was spotted a few days later with Sofía arriving at La Moraleja Hospital to visit King Juan Carlos.

Views

Sofía has expressed opinions on policy including her criticism of the military intervention in Afghanistan, where Spanish troops were taking part at the time, her defence of religious education in schools, and her conviction that gender violence publicity will encourage new cases to occur.

In 2008, on the occasion of her 70th birthday, Sofía made a number of conservative statements on issues then being debated in Spanish society. These statements included her rejection of same-sex marriage, rejection of Gay Pride celebrations, her opposition to abortion, and her defence of religious education in schools. Her opinions were subjected to heavy criticism by LGBT activists and Republican parties like IU and ERC. The governing PSOE did not comment, while the conservative opposition PP also did so, after initial criticism of the Queen from one of its representatives.

A biography published in May 2012 depicts Sofía as a vegetarian who dislikes bullfighting.

Titles and honours 

2 November 193814 May 1962: Her Royal Highness Princess Sophia of Greece and Denmark
14 May 196221 July 1969: Her Royal Highness The Princess of Asturias 
21 July 196922 November 1975: Her Royal Highness The Princess of Spain
22 November 1975 – 19 June 2014: Her Majesty The Queen of Spain
19 June 2014 – present: Her Majesty Queen Sofía of Spain

Queen Sophia was awarded the Order of the Queen of Sheeba by Emperor Haile Selassie of Ethiopia in 1973 upon her and her husband King Juan Carlos's visit to the capital Addis Ababa.
Sofía was appointed to the Grand Cross of The Royal and Distinguished Order of Charles III on 10 May 1962 and to The Royal Order of Queen Maria Luisa on 14 May 1962. The Queen of Spain was appointed to the Collar of the Royal and Distinguished Order of Charles III as dame on 31 October 1983. Since then, Queen Sofía has received different appointments and decorations by more than 40 foreign states.

Notable published works
 En Decelia: fragmentos cerámicos de Decelia y miscelánea arqueológica. Athens, (1959–1960). Edited in Spanish in Spain, 2013.

References

External links

 Official website of the Spanish Royal Family
 Official website of the Queen Sofia Foundation

1938 births
Converts to Roman Catholicism from Eastern Orthodoxy
Danish princesses
Fellows of Exeter College, Oxford
Fellows of Fitzwilliam College, Cambridge
Former Greek Orthodox Christians
Greek princesses
House of Glücksburg (Greece)
Living people
Nobility from Athens
Spanish anti-abortion activists
Spanish infantas
Spanish people of Danish descent
Spanish people of German descent
Spanish people of Greek descent
Spanish people of English descent
Spanish people of Russian descent
Spanish Roman Catholics
Spanish royal consorts
Juan Carlos I of Spain
Members of the Order of the Holy Sepulchre
Grand Crosses Special Class of the Order of Merit of the Federal Republic of Germany
Royal Olympic participants
Autonomous University of Madrid alumni
Alumni of Schule Schloss Salem
20th-century Eastern Orthodox Christians
20th-century Roman Catholics
21st-century Roman Catholics
Recipients of the Medal of the Oriental Republic of Uruguay
Recipients of the Order of Prince Yaroslav the Wise, 1st class
Daughters of kings
Queen mothers